Johanna Haraldsson (born 1980) is a Swedish Social Democratic Party politician.

She was elected member of the Riksdag for the period 2014–2018, from the Jönköping County constituency, and was re-elected in 2022.

References

1980 births
Living people
Women members of the Riksdag
Members of the Riksdag 2014–2018
Members of the Riksdag 2018–2022
Members of the Riksdag 2022–2026
21st-century Swedish women politicians
Members of the Riksdag from the Social Democrats